William Henry Stevenson (1 June 192426 November 2013) was a British-born Canadian author and journalist.

His 1976 book A Man Called Intrepid was about William Stephenson (no relation) and was a best-seller. It was made into a 1979 mini-series starring David Niven. Stevenson followed it in 1983 with another book, Intrepid's Last Case. He published his autobiography in 2012.

In 1976 Stevenson released the  book, 90 Minutes at Entebbe.
It was about Operation Entebbe, an operation where Israeli commandos landed at night at Entebbe Airport in Uganda and succeeded in rescuing the passengers of an airliner hi-jacked by Palestinian militants, while incurring very few casualties.  Stevenson's "instant book" was written, edited, printed and available for sale within weeks of the event it described.

Bibliography 

 The Yellow Wind, 1959, Houghton Mifflin Co., . Reportage on the People's Republic of China between 1954-1957.
 The Bushbabies, 1965, Houghton Mifflin Co., . Children's story inspired by his own family's adventures in Africa.
 The Bormann Brotherhood, 1973 (non-fiction)
 A Man Called Intrepid, 1976, Harcourt, . (non-fiction)
 The Ghosts of Africa, 1980, Harcourt,  . Historical fiction set in World War I colonial German East Africa.
 Intrepid's Last Case, 1983, Michael Joseph Ltd, . (non-fiction)
 Eclipse, 1986 (fiction)
 Booby Trap, 1987 (fiction)
 Kiss the Boys Goodbye: How the United States Betrayed Its Own POWs in Vietnam, 1990, Dutton, .  Co-written with his wife Monika Jensen-Stevenson. (non-fiction)
 90 Minutes at Entebbe, Bantam,  (non-fiction)
 Strike Zion 1967 (non-fiction)
 Zanek!; A Chronicle of the Israeli Force (non-fiction)
 The Revolutionary King: : the true-life sequel to the King and I, 2001, Constable and Robinson, .
 Spymistress: The Life of Vera Atkins, the Greatest Female Secret Agent of World War II, 2006, Arcade Publishing, . (biography)
 Past to Present: A Reporter's Story of War, Spies, People, and Politics, Lyons Press, 2012.

References

External links 
 Publisher's biographical notes in Intrepid's Last Case.
 Kiss the Truth Goodbye review at miafacts.com (only in respect of Stevenson's wife, and the existence of that book)
 

Canadian non-fiction writers
1924 births
2013 deaths
British emigrants to Canada